Leipsic High School is a public high school in Leipsic, Ohio.  It is the only high school in the Leipsic Local Schools district.  The district provides education to students in Leipsic, Belmore, Van Buren, Liberty, Blanchard, Ottawa, and Palmer townships in Putnam County.

The mascot for Leipsic High School is the Vikings.  It is similar in appearance to the Minnesota Vikings of the National Football League. Leipsic Vikings school colors are gold, purple, and white.  They are a member of the Northwest Conference as well as the Putnam County League.

Ohio High School Athletic Association State Championships
 Boys Baseball – 1976

References

External links
 District Website

High schools in Putnam County, Ohio
Public high schools in Ohio